Aaron Glascock is a sound editor.

Glascock was nominated for an Academy Award for Best Sound Editing at the 87th Academy Awards for his work on the film Birdman or (The Unexpected Virtue of Ignorance), his nomination was shared with Martin Hernández.

He has worked on over 70 films.

References

External links

http://designingsound.org/2010/09/the-town-exclusive-interview-with-aaron-glascock-and-curt-schulkey/
http://www.wbsound.com/portfolio/aaron-glascock/

Sound editors
Living people
Year of birth missing (living people)
Place of birth missing (living people)